The vice president of Madagascar was a political position in Madagascar during the era of Malagasy Republic.

References

Politics of Madagascar
Government of Madagascar
Madagascar